Daniels or Daniel's may refer to:

People
 Daniels (surname)
 Daniels (given name)
 Daniels (directors), Daniel Scheinert and Daniel Kwan, a pair of directors

Places

United States
Daniels, Maryland, a former town
Daniels Mill (Daniels, Maryland), a historic site
Daniels County, Montana
Daniel's Pass, high mountain pass in Utah
Daniels Run, small stream in Fairfax, Virginia
Daniels, Wisconsin, a town
Daniels, West Virginia, an unincorporated community

Canada
Daniel's Cove, Newfoundland and Labrador, resettled fishing village

Antarctica
Daniels Range, principal mountain range of the Usarp Mountains

Other uses
Jack Daniel's, Tennessee whiskey distillery and brand
Daniels (EP), a split EP by Mock Orange and The Band Apart
Daniels Motorsport, United Kingdom-based motorsport team
USS Josephus Daniels (CG-27), Belknap-class destroyer leader-cruiser
Daniel (department store), a department store chain in the United Kingdom
Justice Daniels (disambiguation)

See also
Daniells, a surname